Vital Van Landeghem (13 December 1912 – 15 October 1990) was a Belgian footballer. He played in one match for the Belgium national football team in 1932.

References

External links
 

1912 births
1990 deaths
Belgian footballers
Belgium international footballers
Place of birth missing
Association footballers not categorized by position